Zaros is a village and a former municipality in the Heraklion regional unit, Crete, Greece. Since the 2011 local government reform it is part of the municipality Faistos, of which it is a municipal unit. Population 2,953 (2011). Zaros village, at an altitude of 340 metres, is a village with a lake and gorge nearby. The village has a couple of hotels and it is 44 km from Heraklion at the southern foothills of Mount Psiloritis. The population produce olive oil, sultanas, vegetables and spring water. There are a couple of tavernas that serve trout. Close by is Rouvas Gorge, which is part of the Psiloritis mountain range and is on the hiking route known as the E4 European Walking Path. Nearby Zaros village are traditional water mills which have been working since the 16th century, as well as archaeological sites and monasteries. Zaros is also famous for its bottled water derived from Lake Votomos.

Zaros in literature
In James Aldridge's 1944 novel of the escape of a Greek partisan and two Australian soldiers after the Battle of Crete The Sea Eagle, the three are befriended and shaved by a barber in Zaros ("Saros" in the text).

See also
Vrontisi Monastery

References

External links
Municipality of Zaros
Zaros Mineral Water
Food in Zaros Crete

Messara Plain
Populated places in Heraklion (regional unit)